Duran Darreh (also Romanized as Dūrān Darreh, Darrān Darreh, Darān Darreh, Darun Darreh, and Dowrān Darreh) is a village in Hemmatabad Rural District, in the Central District of Borujerd County, Lorestan Province, Iran. At the 2006 census, its population was 24, in 5 families.

References 

Towns and villages in Borujerd County